Turlandi is a village near Shewa Adda and a Union Council in Swabi District of Khyber-Pakhtunkhwa, Pakistan.

Geography
It is located at 34°12'24.87"N 72°19'36.54"E with an altitude of 320 meters (1053 feet).

The people of Turlandi say that the tomb of Ayaz, who was the general of King Mahmud Ghznavi, is also situated in Turlandi but proof is not available. Presently, the tomb is called . Yousaf khan's tomb is in Karamar hill in Sheraghund village.

History
The name Turlandi is a modified form of the name  as used today.  means 'up and down' which is implicitly explained by the presence of a small mountain locally called . It is one of the oldest villages of the area with diverse Pukhtoon/Pashtun cultural bonds. The nearby villages to the east and south, like Tarakai, Rashkai, Bachayay, a part of Managai village, khwaja and Kaludher have originated from this village.

Demographics
, village councils declare that Turlandi has a population of 35,000.

The main tribes (clans) dwelling in Turlandi are Ali Khan Khel, Jan Muhammad Khel, Dawran Khel, Amir Khel, Qabool Khel, Sundi Khel, Babi Khel, Buran Khel and Pacheer Khel. The literacy rate is relatively better and increasing rapidly.

People of Turlandi earn a living primarily in the agricultural industry: mostly wheat, tobacco, vegetables, virgenia as well as small businesses, but are mostly attached with government services.

Culture 
Turlandians eat simple foods and wear simple clothes like shalwar kameez. Black tea is always offered to guests, for which Turlandians are famous in the region.

The famous love couple Yousaf Khan and Shehr Bano are also associated with this village. The first Pashto film was Yousaf Khan and Shehr Bano, shot in Turlandi.

References

Populated places in Swabi District
Union Councils of Swabi District